Natalya Dmitriyevna Sokolova (née , Kulichkova; born 6 October 1949 in Moscow) is a Soviet athlete who competed mainly in the 400 metres.

Sokolova trained at Dynamo in Moscow. She competed for the USSR in the 1976 Summer Olympics held in Montreal, Canada in the 4 x 400 metres where she won the bronze medal with her teammates Inta Kļimoviča, Lyudmila Aksyonova and Nadezhda Ilyina.

References

 Sports Reference

1949 births
Soviet female sprinters
Dynamo sports society athletes
Olympic bronze medalists for the Soviet Union
Athletes (track and field) at the 1976 Summer Olympics
Olympic athletes of the Soviet Union
Living people
European Athletics Championships medalists
Medalists at the 1976 Summer Olympics
Olympic bronze medalists in athletics (track and field)
Universiade medalists in athletics (track and field)
Universiade silver medalists for the Soviet Union